The 2021 AIG Women's British Open was played from 19 to 22 August in Scotland at Carnoustie Golf Links. It was the 45th Women's British Open, the 21st as a major championship on the LPGA Tour, and the second championship held under a sponsorship agreement with AIG, which has rebranded the championship to remove the word "British" and run as the 2021 AIG Women's Open.

It was the second Women's British Open at Carnoustie, following the course's event debut in 2011, which was won by Taiwanese golfer Yani Tseng. The R&A also allowed the return of spectators, after the 2020 Women's British Open was played behind closed doors due to the COVID-19 pandemic in the United Kingdom.

Field
The field was 144 players. As with previous tournaments, most players earned exemptions based on past performance on the Ladies European Tour, the LPGA Tour, previous major championships, or with a high ranking in the Women's World Golf Rankings. The rest of the field earned entry by successfully competing in qualifying tournaments open to any female golfer, professional or amateur, with a low handicap.

Qualification criteria for the 2021 Women's British Open were as follows:

1. Winners of the Women's British Open, aged 60 or younger at the scheduled end of the championship, provided they are still active members of a recognised tour.

Laura Davies, Georgia Hall (3,5), Ariya Jutanugarn (7,10,12), Stacy Lewis (5,7), Mo Martin, Catriona Matthew, Inbee Park (2,5,7,10), Sophia Popov (2,7), Hinako Shibuno (7)

 In-Kyung Kim, Jiyai Shin (7), and Yani Tseng did not play,

2. The top 10 finishers and ties from the 2020 Women's British Open.

Chun In-gee (7,15), Austin Ernst (5,7,10), Andrea Lee, Minjee Lee (5,7,10,15), Caroline Masson, Jennifer Song (5), Jasmine Suwannapura (5)

 Momoko Ueda did not play

3. The top 15 on the final 2020 LET Order of Merit.

Manon De Roey, Laura Fünfstück, Maha Haddioui, Kylie Henry, Céline Herbin, Alice Hewson, Nuria Iturrioz, Stephanie Kyriacou (10), Azahara Muñoz, Sanna Nuutinen, Emily Kristine Pedersen, Luna Sobrón, Anne Van Dam

 Julia Engström did not play

4. The top 8 on the 2021 LET Order of Merit not already exempt as of 15 July.

Olivia Cowan, Gabriella Cowley, Annabel Dimmock, Leonie Harm, Felicity Johnson, Ursula Wikström, Chloe Williams, Christine Wolf

5. The top 25 on the final 2020 LPGA official money list.

Céline Boutier, Ashleigh Buhai, Carlota Ciganda (7), Jodi Ewart Shadoff, Ally Ewing (7,10), Nasa Hataoka (7,10), Brooke Henderson (7,10), Moriya Jutanugarn (7,10), Danielle Kang (7,14), Cheyenne Knight, Kim Sei-young (7,14), Lydia Ko (7,10), Nelly Korda (7,10,14,19), Jennifer Kupcho (7), Gaby López, Yealimi Noh, Anna Nordqvist (15), Amy Olson (7), Mel Reid (7), Ryu So-yeon (7,13), Madelene Sagström, Angela Stanford (15)

 Mirim Lee (7,13), Park Hee-young and Yu Liu did not play

6. The top 32 on the 2021 Race to the CME Globe points list not already exempt under criteria 5. as of 15 July.

Marina Alex, Brittany Altomare (7), Pajaree Anannarukarn (10), Ana Belac, Chella Choi, Cydney Clanton, Jenny Coleman, Matilda Castren (10), Perrine Delacour, Kristen Gillman, Hannah Green (7,14), Jaye Marie Green, Mina Harigae, Esther Henseleit, Ji Eun-hee, Sarah Kemp, Megan Khang (7), Christina Kim, Katherine Kirk, Jessica Korda (7,10), Bronte Law, Alison Lee (10), Lee Jeong-eun (7,12), Lee Mi-hyang, Brittany Lincicome, Nanna Koerstz Madsen, Leona Maguire, Wichanee Meechai, Giulia Molinaro, Su-Hyun Oh, Ryann O'Toole (10), Pornanong Phatlum, Gerina Piller, Sarah Schmelzel, Lizette Salas (7), Yuka Saso (7,10,12), Jenny Shin, Lauren Stephenson, Elizabeth Szokol, Emma Talley, Patty Tavatanakit (7,10,13), Lexi Thompson (7), Albane Valenzuela, Amy Yang (7), Angel Yin

 Shanshan Feng (7), Hsu Wei-ling (10), Ko Jin-young (7,10,13,15), Kim Hyo-joo (7,10), and Lin Xiyu did not play

7. The top 50 in the Women's World Golf Rankings as of 12 July.

Ayaka Furue, Charley Hull, M. J. Hur, Kim A-lim (12), Park Sung-hyun (12,14)

 Choi Hye-jin, Mone Inami, Jang Ha-na, Lim Hee-jeong, Park Hyun-kyung, Park Min-ji, Ryu Hae-ran, Ai Suzuki, Miyu Yamashita did not play

8. The top 3 on the JLPGA Money List not already exempt as of the Suntory Ladies Open (13 June)

Erika Hara

9. The top 2 on the JLPGA Money List not already exempt as of 29 June

10. Winners of any recognised LET or LPGA Tour events in the 2021 calendar year.

Pia Babnik, Lucie Malchirand, Lee-Anne Pace, Marianne Skarpnord, Atthaya Thitikul

11. Winners of the 2020 JLPGA Money List and KLPGA Money List.

12. Winners of the last five editions of the U.S. Women's Open

13. Winners of the last five editions of the ANA Inspiration

Pernilla Lindberg

14. Winners of the last five editions of the Women's PGA Championship

15. Winners of the last five editions of The Evian Championship

16. The leading two (not otherwise exempt) in the 2021 Suntory Ladies Open

Serena Aoki

17. The 2020 Women's Amateur Asia-Pacific champion, 2020 and 2021 Womens Amateur Championship champions, 2020 and 2021 U.S. Women's Amateur champions, 2020 and 2021 European Ladies Amateur Championship champions, the 2021 Augusta National Women's Amateur champion, the 2020 Mark H. McCormack Medal winner, and the highest ranked women in the World Amateur Golf Ranking from Great Britain and Ireland as of week 25, and provided they are still amateurs at the time of the Championship.

Aline Krauter (a), Louise Duncan (a), Tsubasa Kajitani (a), Ingrid Lindblad (a), Lauren Walsh (a), Rose Zhang (a)

 Paula Schulz-Hanssen and Jensen Castle did not play

18. Any player who did not compete in the previous year's Women's British Open due to maternity, who subsequently received an extension of membership for the maternity from the player's home tour in the previous year, provided she was otherwise qualified to compete in the previous year's Women's British Open.

19. 2021 Women's Olympic Golf gold medallist.

20. The leading five players (not otherwise exempt) in the 2021 Trust Golf Women's Scottish Open

Whitney Hillier, Haeji Kang, Karolin Lampert, Kelsey Macdonald, Prima Thammaraks

Qualifiers: Aditi Ashok, Nicole Broch Larsen, Trichat Cheenglab, Ssu-Chia Cheng, Gemma Dryburgh, Cloe Frankish, Annabell Fuller (a), Johanna Gustavsson, Muni He, Paula Reto, Kirsten Rudgeley (a), Agathe Sauzon, Magdalena Simmermacher, Marissa Steen, Pannarat Thanapolboonyaras, Lindsey Weaver

Past champions in the field

Made the cut

Missed the cut

Course
The par-72 2021 course layout at Carnoustie Golf Links was 350 yards longer than the set-up for the 2011 Women's British Open, also held at Carnoustie. It was now 6,840 yards  (6,254m)

Round summaries

First round
Thursday, 19 August 2021

Second round
Friday, 20 August 2021

Third round
Saturday, 21 August 2021

Final round
Sunday, 22 August 2021

Scorecard

Cumulative tournament scores, relative to par
{|class="wikitable" span = 50 style="font-size:85%;
|-

|style="background: Red;" width=10|
|Eagle
|style="background: Pink;" width=10|
|Birdie
|style="background: PaleGreen;" width=10|
|Bogey
|style="background: Green;" width=10|
|Double bogey
|}
Source:

References

External links

Coverage on the LPGA Tour site
Coverage on the Ladies European Tour

Women's British Open
Golf tournaments in Scotland
British Open
Women's British Open
Women's British Open